64th National Board of Review Awards

Best Picture: 
 Howards End 
The 64th National Board of Review Awards, honoring the best in filmmaking in 1992, were announced by the National Board of Review on 16 December 1992 and given on 22 February 1993.

Top 10 films
Howards End
The Crying Game
Glengarry Glen Ross
A Few Good Men
The Player
Unforgiven
One False Move
Peter's Friends
Bob Roberts
Malcolm X

Top foreign Films
Indochine
Raise the Red Lantern
Tous les matins du monde
Mediterraneo
Like Water for Chocolate

Winners
Best Actor:
Jack Lemmon - Glengarry Glen Ross
Best Actress:
Emma Thompson - Howards End
Best Director:
James Ivory - Howards End
Best Documentary Feature:
Brother's Keeper
Best Film:
Howards End
Best Foreign Film:
Indochine, France
Best Supporting Actor:
Jack Nicholson - A Few Good Men
Best Supporting Actress:
Judy Davis - Husbands and Wives
Career Achievement Award
Shirley Temple

External links
National Board of Review of Motion Pictures :: Awards for 1992

1992
1992 film awards
1982 in American cinema